The Kunak District is an administrative district in the Malaysian state of Sabah, part of the Tawau Division which includes the districts of Kunak, Lahad Datu, Semporna and Tawau. The capital of the district is in Kunak Town. Kunak district were part of Lahad Datu before 1990.

Demographics 

According to the last census in 2010, the population of Kunak district is estimated to be around 61,094 inhabitants. As in other districts of Sabah, there are a significant number of illegal immigrants from the nearby southern Philippines, mainly from the Sulu Archipelago and Mindanao, many of whom are not included in the population statistics.

Gallery

See also 
 Districts of Malaysia

References

Further reading

External links 
 
  Kunak District Council
  Kunak District Office